The 4th Field Regiment was an artillery regiment of the New Zealand Military Forces raised during the Second World War. It saw service as part of the 2nd New Zealand Division during the Greek, North African, Tunisian and Italian campaigns, before being disbanded in January 1946.

References 

 

Artillery regiments of New Zealand
Military units and formations established in 1940
Military units and formations disestablished in 1946